Retta Scott (February 23, 1916August 26, 1990) was an American artist. She was the first woman to receive screen credit as an animator at the Walt Disney Animation Studios.

Early life and education
Scott was born in Omak, Washington on February 23, 1916. She graduated from Seattle's Roosevelt High School in 1934. Scott received two scholarships over the course of her education. The first was from the Seattle Art & Music Foundation, who awarded her with a scholarship in the 4th grade that she used to attend 10 years of creative art classes. She later received 3-year scholarship to attend the Chouinard Art Institute, so she moved to Los Angeles, California. She spent much of her free time sketching wildlife at the nearby Griffith Park zoo. Her ambition was to mold a career in Fine arts.

As her time at the Chouinard Art Institute ended, its director, Vern Caldwell, urged Scott to apply for work with Walt Disney, based on her passion for animals. She was initially uninterested due to the cartoon shorts the company was known for, but Caldwell recommended her to work on Bambi, a full film which was in production. She eventually joined the company in 1938 to work in the Story Department.

According to Country Life, the Seattle Art Museum showcased Scott's paintings as part of a 1940 exhibit.

Career at Disney
Scott worked on storyboards to develop scenes of Bambi, his mother, and the film’s hunting dogs, on which she spent weeks to develop them into “vicious, snarling, really mean beasts.” Male artists in the company were stunned, who initially assumed that only a man could create drawings with such intensity and technical skill. Her sketches caught the eye of Disney, so when the film went into production she was assigned to animate scenes of hunting dogs chasing Faline. She worked under the film's supervising director, David D. Hand, and was tutored by Disney animator Eric Larson. This was a significant coup for the young woman, since at the 1930s-era Disney studio, women were considered only for routine tasks: "Ink and paint art was a laborious part of the animation process, and was solely the domain of women..." Her promotion to animator was in part thanks to the success of herself and other women such as Bianca Majolie, Sylvia Holland, and Mary Blair as storyboard artists.  Even after receiving a promotion to animator, she and her animations continued being under appreciated in the industry. Though the most recognized Walt Disney female artist is Mary Blair, it is Retta Scott who opened up the doors for women in the animation industry.  She became the first woman to receive screen credit as an animator.  By the spring of 1941, Scott was also considered a "specialist in animal sketches."

Scott helped produce Fantasia and Dumbo, as well as an adaptation of The Wind in the Willows that was later cancelled. She also made an appearance in The Reluctant Dragon, and worked independently with colleague Woolie Reitherman on a cancelled children’s book called B-1st. Despite being laid off in 1941, Scott was quickly rehired in 1942, assisting in educational videos and other smaller-scale shorts. Her brief time laid off was partially due to a Disney animators' strike in the summer of 1941, despite Scott being one of only a few animators not involved in the strike. She retired on August 2, 1946 after marrying submarine commander Benjamin Worcester, becoming Retta Scott Worcester.

In 2000, the Walt Disney Co. posthumously awarded her one of that year's Disney Legends Awards for her contributions. Scott's early Disney sketches can be found at The Walt Disney Family Museum in San Francisco, California.

Later work
Scott  and her husband moved to Washington, D.C, where she illustrated books such as The Santa Claus Book and Happy Birthday. She also continued working with Disney through freelance jobs such as illustrating the Big Golden Book edition of Disney's Cinderella. Her work caught the attention of past and current Disney employees, including Jonas Rivera, producer of Up, who commented, “I’ve always loved the Retta Scott Cinderella because it doesn’t look like the movie, but somehow it feels like the movie.” Retta and her husband divorced in 1978, and she remained an active illustrator until she was again hired as an animator in 1982 for the Luckey-Zamora Moving Picture Company. She continued to impress artists, especially male artists who initially underestimated her work, and was eager to teach her skills.

Scott suffered a stroke in December 1985 and died on August 26, 1990 at her home in Foster City, California.

Filmography

References

Further reading 
Gabler, Neal. “City on a Hill.” Walt Disney: The Triumph of the American Imagination, Alfred A. Knopf, 2006, p. 550. Internet Archive.
Ghez, Didier. They Drew As They Pleased: The Hidden Art of Disney's Musical Years, the 1940s. Chronicle Books, 2016. pp. 131.

Nathala Hollt,The Queens of Animation, Little Brown, 2019. 
Thomas, Frank, and Ollie Johnston. The Illusion of Life: Disney Animation, Hyperion, 1995, p. 338. Internet Archive.
Usher, Shaun. “The Creative Work Is Performed by Young Men.” Letters of Note, 9 Sept. 2009.

External links
Photograph of Retta Scott at Disney Studios, 
Retta Scott Disney Legend page

1916 births
1990 deaths
20th-century American women artists
American animators
Artists from Washington (state)
Chouinard Art Institute alumni
People from Omak, Washington
Walt Disney Animation Studios people
American women animators